Gillow is a surname. Notable people with the surname include:

 Alfred Gillow (1835–1897), English cricketer
 Eulogio Gillow y Zavala, archbishop of Antequera
 Joseph Gillow (1850–1921), Roman Catholic antiquary
 Robert Gillow (1704–1772), cabinetmaker
 Russ Gillow (born 1940), ice hockey player
 Shara Gillow (born 1987), Australian cyclist
 Thomas Gillow (died 1687), English actor
 Wilf Gillow (born 1890s), footballer

See also
Gillow, hamlet in the parish of Hentland, Herefordshire, England
Waring & Gillow, furniture manufacturers